Bob the Builder is a CGI animated children's television series and a reboot of the 1999 animated television series of the same name. It premiered in the United Kingdom on Channel 5 on 1 September 2015 and ended on 30 December 2018. 130 episodes and 3 series were produced.

Episodes

Cast

United Kingdom
 Lee Ingleby as Bob 
 Blake Harrison as Scoop
 Paul Panting as Muck
 Steven Kynman as Lofty and Dash Lightning
 Terry Mynott as Two-Tonne and Tiny
 Jacob Scipio as Leo
 Joanne Froggatt as Wendy
 Sarah Hadland as Dizzy, Lift Voice, Betsy and Vet Tilly
 Nick Mercer as Mr. Bentley and Farmer Pickles
 Marcel McCalla as Roley
 Sam Swann as Stretch
 William Haresceugh as JJ (Not to be confused with the character from the Original Series)
 Mia Hope as Saffi
 Lucy Montgomery as Mayor Madison, Jenny Dobbs and Shifter
 Holly Hazelton as Mila
 Dustin Demri-Burns as Tread
 Steve Cannon as Phillip and various minor roles
 Phil Cornwell as Alfred

United States
 Colin Murdock as Bob
 Blake Harrison as Scoop
 Vincent Tong as Muck and Brandon
 Richard Ian Cox as Lofty
 Richard Newman as Two-Tonne
 Daniel Bacon as Leo 
 Joanne Froggatt as Wendy
 Claire Corlett as Dizzy
 Ian James Corlett as Roley and Mr Bentley
 Erin Mathews as JJ and Vet Tilly
 Lee Tockar as Tiny
 Peter New as Stretch
 Steve Cannon as Phillip
 Lucy Montgomery as Jenny Dobbs
 Cole Howard as Shifter
 Ryan Beil as Tread
 Nicole Oliver as Mayor Madison
 Kazumi Evans as Saffi
 Rebecca Shoichet as Mila and Betsy

Production and broadcast
Turner Broadcasting System bought the broadcasting rights for the 2015 series in the United Kingdom to be repeated on Cartoon Network UK's sister preschool channel Cartoonito UK. The channel began airing the series in January 2016.

In the US, the series airs on PBS Kids in the United States on 14 November 2015 to November 2018. Qubo aired the series from 2019 to 2021 for the British dub before Qubo ceased operations. The show currently airs on Kids Street.

In Canada, the series aired on Family Jr. while in Quebec, the series aired on Télé-Québec.

In Australia, the series airs on 10 Peach and on ABC Kids.

In New Zealand, the series airs on TVNZ.

References

External links 

 
2010s British children's television series
2010s British animated television series
2015 British television series debuts
2018 British television series endings
2010s Canadian children's television series
2010s Canadian animated television series
2015 Canadian television series debuts
2018 Canadian television series endings
British computer-animated television series
Canadian computer-animated television series
Animated television series reboots
British children's animated comedy television series
British children's animated fantasy television series
British preschool education television series
Canadian children's animated comedy television series
Canadian children's animated fantasy television series
Canadian preschool education television series
Animated preschool education television series
2010s preschool education television series
Television series by Mattel Creations
Television series by DHX Media
Television series by Rainmaker Studios
PBS Kids shows
Family Jr. original programming
Channel 5 (British TV channel) original programming
Qubo